A status referendum was held in Curaçao on 15 May 2009. The referendum was on whether to accept the proposed agreement on becoming an autonomous country within the Kingdom of the Netherlands as part of the dissolution of the Netherlands Antilles. It was approved by 51.99% of voters.

Results

References

Referendums in Curaçao
Referendums in the Netherlands Antilles
Status referendum
Curacao
Curacao
History of the Caribbean Netherlands
History of the Netherlands Antilles
Curacao